Chaumahla railway station is a railway station in Jhalawar district, Rajasthan. Its code is CMU. It serves Chaumahla town. The station consists of 3 platforms. Passenger, Express, and Superfast trains halt here.

References

Railway stations in Jhalawar district
Kota railway division